Alicja Sakaguchi (born 1954 in Szczecin) is a Polish linguist and university professor in the fields of Esperanto and interlinguistics.

Biography 
Alicja Sakaguchi earned a master's degree after studying Hungarian and Esperantology at Eötvös Loránd University in Budapest (1974 to 1979); she completed her doctorate in 1982. From 1981 to 1985 she was a lecturer at the University of Paderborn, then from 1986 to 1998 at the Goethe University Frankfurt. She received her habilitation  in 2000 after publishing a book on interlinguistics. From 2001 to 2002 she was assistant professor of modern languages at Adam Mickiewicz University in Poznań; since 2003 she has been a professor there, teaching interlinguistics, Esperanto, German and intercultural communication.

She is married to Takashi Sakaguchi, a Japanese man whom she met through the Esperanto movement, and has two adult children, Dai and Leo, who are native speakers of Esperanto. Both sons were born in Mömbris in Germany, a town close to Frankfurt, where she was teaching at the time.

Selected works 
 "Rasmus Kristian Rasks Konzeption einer Welthilfssprache" ("Rasmus Christian Rask's Concept of a Global Auxiliary Language") in Historiographia Linguistica (co-author with Heribert Rück, 1989) 16: 311–326.
 Rasmus Christian Rask: Traktatu d'un Lingua universale (Abhandlung über eine allgemeine Sprache/Traktato pri generala lingvo). ("Treatise on general linguistics", Part II of the manuscript "Optegnelser til en Pasigraphie" ("Records for a Pasigraphy", 1823). Edited with commentary by Alicja Sakaguchi. Frankfurt: Lang, 1996.
 Interlinguistik: Gegenstand, Ziele, Aufgaben, Methoden ("Interlinguistics: Purpose, objectives, tasks, methods") Frankfurt: Lang, 1998 (Duisburger Arbeiten zur Sprach- und Kulturwissenschaft 36).
 "Einige Bemerkungen zur dreisprachigen Erziehung (Polnisch-Esperanto-Deutsch) meiner Kinder" ("Some comments on the trilingual education (Polish-Esperanto-German) of my children") in Phänomene im semantisch-syntaktischen Grenzbereich: Materialien der internationalen Linguistenkonferenz Karpacz 27.9.-29, Leslaw Cirko and Martin Grimberg (eds.), September 2004. (Supplements to Orbis Linguarum 47). Dresden: Neisse Verlag, p. 133-145.

References 

1954 births
Living people
Writers from Szczecin
Linguists from Poland
Women linguists
Polish Esperantists
Eötvös Loránd University alumni
Paderborn University alumni
Goethe University Frankfurt alumni
Polish expatriates in Germany
Polish expatriates in Hungary
Polish women academics